Melanostomias melanops is a species of fish endemic to the Atlantic, Indian and Pacific oceans. It's hue is black and it has dark blotches. It has 13 and 15 dorsal and anal soft rays, respectively.

References 

Fish described in 1902
Stomiidae
Taxa named by August Brauer